Ralph Waldo Emerson School may refer to:

Ralph Waldo Emerson School (Gary, Indiana), listed on the NRHP in Lake County, Indiana
Ralph Waldo Emerson Indianapolis Public School No. 58, Indianapolis, IN, listed on the NRHP in Indiana
Ralph Waldo Emerson School (St. Louis, Missouri), listed on the National Register of Historic Places in St. Louis County, Missouri

See also
Emerson School (disambiguation)